Marzena Broda  (born 27 February 1965, in Cracow) is a Polish poet, novelist, playwright and screenwriter.

Selected bibliography 
 Światło Przestrzeni (Oficyna Literacka, 1991) 
 Cudzoziemszczyzna (A5, 1995)
 Nie dotykać Normana Hammera (Muza, 2004) 
 Skaza (Dialog, 2004) 
 Luka (Rebis, 2005)
 Prawo brzoskwinki do gromu (Instytut Mikołowski, 2008) 
 Zwykłe rzeczy (Nisza, 2013)

References

1965 births
Living people